The National Engineering Services Pakistan (trading name: NESPAK) NES, is a Pakistan-based multinational state-owned enterprise and an energy contractor which provides consulting, construction, engineering, and management services globally. It is one of the largest engineering consultant management companies in Africa and Asia. The company's headquarters' is located in Lahore with office's in Riyadh, Muscat, Tehran, Kabul, Doha and London.

As of 2016, NES has been contracted to carry out 3,642 projects out of which 3,116 are domestic and 526 are overseas projects with the cumulative cost of projects at $243 billion. Among its projects include $1.65 billion Lahore Metro, $4 billion Neelum–Jhelum Project, $800 million New Islamabad Airport, $893 million expansion of Salalah Airport and the $500 million Farah River Dam Project as well as managing the Karachi Nuclear Power Plant on behalf of Nuclear Regulatory Authority of Pakistan. NESPAK is also managing the supervision of $128 million 15 small dams' project in Western Saudi Arabia and the Obudu Dam project in Nigeria.

Corporate overview

Founded in 1973 by the Government of Pakistan, it undertaken the operations in the country and expanded its operational scope in Central Asia and Africa with completing more than 450 projects worldwide. NESPAK is registered with a number of international funding agencies such as IBRD, ADB, IDB, etc. To date, NESPAK has undertaken 3651 projects, of which 3125 have been domestic and 526 have been overseas projects located in Afghanistan, Azerbaijan, Bangladesh, Bahrain, Benin, Cameroon, Chad, Dominica, Ethiopia, Gambia, Ghana, Guinea, Iran, Iraq, Kazakhstan, Kyrgyzstan, Libya, Nepal, Nigeria, Oman, Pakistan, Qatar, Republic of Yemen, Saudi Arabia, Senegal, Sierra Leone, Somalia, Sudan, Syria, Tajikistan, Tanzania, Thailand, Turkey, Turkmenistan, UAE and Uzbekistan.

The cumulative cost of the projects undertaken by NESPAK is US$243 billion. It is headquartered at NESPAK House, Model Town Lahore. It works side by side with WAPDA, NHA, FWO and PAK PWD in various fields of infrastructure and energy projects in Pakistan. It is one of the best world-renowned organizations of Pakistan. Every Government Project has something to do with NESPAK at some time of its implementation or planning.

Company's management

The company is managed by a board of directors comprising a chairman, a managing director, and eleven other directors. The day-to-day functions of the company are looked after by the managing director assisted by the executive vice-presidents and vice-presidents/division. Various divisions headed by vice-presidents/general managers are broadly divided into project management and speciality groups. The project management divisions are responsible for management of projects, and the speciality divisions are centres of excellence for various disciplines.

Services

NESPAK provides services in the following sectors:

 Energy
 Water Resources Development and Dam Engineering
 Communication
 Architecture and Planning
 Public Health Engineering
 Industrial
 Oil, Gas and Petrochemical
 Environment
 Information Technology (IT) and GIS
 Structure design
 Construction Management
 Building Information Modeling (BIM)

Field of Specialization

NESPAK specialises in the fields of power and mechanical; water and agriculture; architecture and planning; highways, bridges, airports and seaports; environmental and public health engineering; engineering for industry; heating, ventilation and air-conditioning; information technology and geographical information systems (GIS).

Human Resources
At present, NESPAK has a staff strength of 5314 employees including 3964 highly qualified engineers, architects, planners, geologists, economists, Agriculturists, Environmentalists and other professionals.

References

External links
 Official website

International engineering consulting firms
Government-owned companies of Pakistan
Pakistan federal departments and agencies
1973 establishments in Pakistan
Multinational companies headquartered in Pakistan
Companies based in Lahore